Mask of the Dragon is a 1951 American mystery thriller film directed by Sam Newfield and starring Richard Travis , Sheila Ryan and Michael Whalen. It was released by the independent company Lippert Pictures. The film's sets were designed by the art director Harry Reif. Part of it was set in a television studio, which was considered novel at the time.

Synopsis
An American army officer in Korea agrees to deliver a jade dragon statuette to an address in Los Angeles. He is murdered soon after arriving in the city and his friend private detective Phil Ramsey takes up the investigation with the assistance of his girlfriend Ginny.

Cast
Richard Travis as Phil Ramsey
Sheila Ryan as Ginny O'Donnell
Sid Melton as Manchu Murphy
Michael Whalen as Maj. Clinton
Lyle Talbot as Lt. "Mack" McLaughlin
 Dee Tatum as Terry Newell
 Richard Emory as Army Lt. Daniel Oliver
 Jack Reitzen as 	Prof. Kim Ho
 Charles Iwamoto as 	Simo 
 Karl Davis as 	Kingpin 
 Johnny Grant as Johnny Grant - TV Show Host 
 Carla Martin as Sarah
 Ray Singer as Grantland
 Eddie Lee as 	Chin Koo - Korean Shop Owner
 Margia Dean as Television Actress

References

External links

1951 films
1950s thriller films
American thriller films
1950s English-language films
Lippert Pictures films
Films directed by Sam Newfield
American black-and-white films
Films set in Korea
Films set in Los Angeles
1950s American films